The City of Capitals is a mixed-use complex composed of two skyscrapers and an office building located on plot 9 in the Moscow International Business Center in Moscow, Russia with a total area of . The two skyscrapers are named after the two historical capitals of Russia: Moscow and Saint Petersburg. Construction of the complex began in 2005, with the office building completed in 2008 and the two skyscrapers completed in 2009.

As of 2022, Moscow Tower is the eighth-tallest building in Russia and the 21st-tallest residential building in the world.

History 
Construction of the complex was first proposed in 2003. Due to the Capital City complex needed to be built in a quick schedule, a design team was gathered from a span of 11 time zones from Seattle to Moscow. An obstacle for planning of the skyscraper was the absence of applicable local building codes since the current codes dated back to 1950 did not apply for tall buildings. As a result, codes of the complex were modeled off after British standards, which established high standards for fire safety, such as 4-hour structural fire resistance and the use of 30-minute fire-rated glass. According to the schedule, NBBJ and the Arup Group are to focus on completing the structural design while the architectural design is being worked on. After this is completed, the design team worked with the Moscow government to fulfill the building codes for the complex.

Construction of the complex started in 2005. The office building which served as a stylobate for the complex was completed in 2008. In July 2008, the Moscow Tower surpassed the Naberezhnaya Tower as the tallest building in Russia and Europe. In 2009, construction of the complex was completed. In 2012, The Shard in London, United Kingdom surpassed Moscow Tower as the tallest building in Europe, but only held that position for a few months as the Capital City complex's neighboring Mercury City Tower surpassed The Shard's height.

Design 

According to Yuri Starodubtsev of the Capital Group and Joey Myers and Larry Goetz of the NBBJ, the design complex of the Capital City complex was inspired after Vladimir Tatlin's "Corner Counter Relief" (1914). Tatlin's work in the early 20th century was to redesign the project in order to accommodate more space. One concept approached by Tatlin was a tightly-drawn interstitial shape through the orthogonal geometry of a typical room. The Capital City complex uses this concept by the offset rotation of the tower segments to create a dynamic departure from the square's stability. This rotational effect, achieved through a slight cantilever on only two façades of each vertical segment, does not compromise the regularity of the towers’ structure.

Reinforced concrete is to be used for the foundation due to its abundance in the region. Despite this, construction of the complex was carried out in atypical conditions. The tower pile caps were each installed during continuous, 33-hour mid-winter pours in temperatures ranging from -32 to -34°C (-25 to -30°F), under a large heated tent to keep the concrete from freezing. Running five meters deep and measuring 6,500 cubic meters (230,000 cubic feet) and 6,000 cubic meters (212,000 cubic feet), the foundation utilized a relatively standard rebar cage and wooden form work.

The design team collaborated with German curtain wall specialist Schüco to create a dynamic facade for the towers and podium building. The towers are enclosed in a unitized panel system with four-sided structural-silicone glazing. The aluminum panels compose a shifting super grid that resonates with the towers’ shifting blocks. The panels also shift in plan, some protruding outward while others are slightly inset to accommodate vertical LED lighting.

The City of Capitals is to serve as a mixed-use complex, featuring apartments, office space, retail, restaurants, fitness center, and a garden. The complex also features a six-level basement that includes more than 2,200 parking spaces, electrical equipment and enlarged fire compartments.

Each tower is separated into several levels. For the Moscow Tower, the top four levels which served as residences are named from bottom to top: Beleveue, Sky, Star, and Galaxy. The same applies to St. Petersburg Tower, except it only has three levels rather than four. As a result, it does not have a level named Galaxy. Apartments cover floors 18-72 of Moscow Tower and floors 18-61 of the St. Petersburg Tower.

Construction gallery

Awards 

 In 2010, Moscow Tower was awarded by Emporis the Emporis Skyscraper Award for aesthetic appearance and compatibility with the urban environment.

See also 

 List of tallest buildings in Moscow
 List of tallest buildings in Russia
 List of tallest buildings in Europe
 List of tallest structures in the former Soviet Union
 List of tallest residential buildings

References

External links 

 
  

Buildings and structures completed in 2009
Moscow International Business Center
Twin towers
Skyscraper office buildings in Moscow